The Lessepsian migration (also called Erythrean invasion) is the migration of marine species across the Suez Canal, usually from the Red Sea to the Mediterranean Sea, and more rarely in the opposite direction. When the canal was completed in 1869, fish, crustaceans, mollusks, and other marine animals and plants were exposed to an artificial passage between the two naturally separate bodies of water, and cross-contamination was made possible between formerly isolated ecosystems. The phenomenon is still occurring today. It is named after Ferdinand de Lesseps, the French diplomat in charge of the canal's construction.

The migration of invasive species through the Suez Canal from the Indo-Pacific region has been facilitated by many factors, both abiotic and anthropogenic, and presents significant implications for the ecological health and economic stability of the contaminated areas; of particular concern is the fisheries industry in the Eastern Mediterranean. Despite these threats, the phenomenon has allowed scientists to study an invasive event on a large scale in a short period of time, which usually takes hundreds of years in natural conditions.

In a wider context, the term Lessepsian migration is also used to describe any animal migration facilitated by man-made structures, i.e. one which would not have occurred had it not been for the presence of an artificial structure.

Background

The opening of the Suez Canal created the first saltwater passage between the Mediterranean Sea and the Red Sea.

Because the surface of the Red Sea is slightly higher in elevation than the Eastern Mediterranean, the canal serves as a tidal strait by which Red Sea water pours into the Mediterranean. The Bitter Lakes, which are natural hypersaline lakes that form part of the canal, blocked the migration of Red Sea species into the Mediterranean for many decades, but as the salinity of the lakes gradually equalized with that of the Red Sea, the barrier to migration was removed, and plants and animals from the Red Sea have begun to colonize the eastern Mediterranean. The Red Sea, an extension of the Indian Ocean, is generally saltier and less nutrient-rich than the Mediterranean, an extension of the Atlantic Ocean, so Red Sea species, able to tolerate harsh environments, have advantages over Atlantic species in the conditions of the Eastern Mediterranean. Accordingly, most migrations between the two bodies of water are invasions of Red Sea species into the Mediterranean, and relatively few migrations occur in the opposite direction. The construction of the Aswan High Dam across the Nile River in the 1960s reduced the inflow of fresh water and nutrient-rich silt from the Nile into the eastern Mediterranean, making conditions in the eastern Mediterranean even more like those of the Red Sea, thereby increasing the impact of the invasions and facilitating the occurrence of new ones.

The Red Sea is a profusely abundant tropical marine environment sharing species in common with the eastern Indo-Pacific region, while the Mediterranean is a temperate sea with much lower productivity; the two ecosystems are extremely different in terms of structure and ecology. The Suez Canal quickly became the main pathway for the introduction of invasive species into the Eastern Mediterranean, having zoogeographic and ecological consequences far beyond what the designers could foresee. The Lessepsian migration includes hundreds of Red Sea and Indo-Pacific species that have colonized and established themselves in the Eastern Mediterranean system, causing biogeographic changes without precedent in human memory. The trend is accelerating: to take just the fish, a long-term cross-Basin survey engaged by the Mediterranean Science Commission recently documented that in the first twenty years of our century more exotic fish species from the Indo-Pacific Ocean had reached the Mediterranean than during the entire 20th century.

To this day, one can estimate at over 1,000 the number of species - both vertebrates and invertebrates - native to the Red Sea that have been identified in the Mediterranean Sea. Many others are as yet unidentified. From there they have spread even further afield, supplying 95% of Indo-Pacific species that have reached the Ponto-Caspian seas and increasingly rapidly. In the late 20th and early 21st centuries, the Egyptian government announced its intentions to deepen and widen the canal, which raised concerns from marine biologists, fearing this would facilitate the crossing of the canal for additional species, accelerating the invasion of Red Sea species into the Mediterranean. The extension was completed in 2015.

Ecological impacts

Outcompetition of natives

Native Argyrosomus regius vs. invasive Scomberomorus commerson
A wide-ranging species in the eastern Atlantic and Mediterranean, the meagre Argyrosomus regius is a species indigenous to the Eastern Mediterranean and was one of the most common commercial fish in the Levant. However, this species has since disappeared from local catches, while the narrow-barred Spanish mackerel Scomberomorus commerson, a known Lessepsian migrant, has dramatically increased in population. Studies performed on this occurrence conclude that, due to similar life histories and diets, this may be an example of an invasive migrant outcompeting a native species and occupying its niche.

Native Melicertus kerathurus vs. invasive prawns
Eight species of invasive prawns from the Erythraean Sea have been recorded in the Eastern Mediterranean. These prawns are considered highly prized in Levantine fisheries, and compose most of the prawn catch off the Mediterranean coast of Egypt, being 6% of total Egyptian landings. However, this high abundance of invasive prawns has led to the decline of a native penaeid prawn, Melicertus kerathurus, which supported a commercial Israeli fishery throughout the 1950s. Due to outcompetition and its habitat being overrun by these migrants, this native species has since disappeared, with resultant detrimental impacts on the commercial fishery.

Parasitic invaders
The invasion of new Red Sea species into the Mediterranean has also facilitated the invasion of their associated parasites, for example the copepod Eudactylera aspera, which was found on a spinner shark, Carcharhinus brevipinna, taken off the coast of Tunisia. The copepod had originally been described from specimens taken from C. brevipinna off Madagascar and its finding in the Mediterranean has arguably confirmed the previously disputed status of C. brevipinna as a Lessepsian migrant. In addition, parasites originating in the Red Sea have shown an ability to use related native Mediterranean fish species as alternative hosts; e.g. the copepod Nipergasilus bora was known to parasitise the grey mullets Mugil cephalus and Liza carinata in the Red Sea, both taxa having been recorded as Lessepsian migrants, and was subsequently found parasitising the native Mediterranean mullets Chelon aurata and Chelon labrosus.

Sometimes, the invasion of these parasites may have the effect of reducing the competitive advantages that Red Sea invaders have in the Mediterranean. For example, the Indo-Pacific swimming crab Charybdis longicollis was first recorded in the Mediterranean in the mid-1950s and became dominant in silty and sandy substrates off the coast of Israel, making up to 70% of the total biomass in these habitats. Until 1992, none of the specimens collected was infected with the parasite Heterosaccus dollfusi, but in that year, a few infected crabs were collected. The parasite is a barnacle which desexes its host. Within three years, the parasite had spread to southern Turkey and 77% of the crabs collected in Haifa Bay were infected. This rapid increase and high infection rate is attributed to the extremely high population density of the host and the year-round reproduction of the parasite. One effect of this was that the population of the Mediterranean native swimming crab Liocarcinus vernalis recovered somewhat.

Species displacements
Fisheries have been heavily affected. The goldband goatfish, Upeneus moluccensis, was first recorded in the Eastern Mediterranean in the 1930s and has since established an abundant population. Following the warm winter of 1954–1955, it increased to 83% of the Israeli catch, replacing the native red mullet, which also affected the Egyptian fishery, being 3% of their total landings. The high water temperatures of this unusually warm winter may have resulted in the poor survival of red mullet juveniles, which may have allowed the goatfish population to expand into the opened niche. Native mullet have since been displaced into deeper, cooler waters, where Lessepsian migrants consist of only 20% of the catch, whereas in shallower, warmer waters, this invasive species takes up a staggering 87% of the catch. From these data, the Lessepsian migrants apparently have not adapted to the more temperate environment of the deeper areas of the basin, but have established dominant populations in the habitats most similar to the tropical sea habitats from which they came. The population of Caesio varilineata (a fusilier fish, Caesionidae), recently reported from the eastern Mediterranean Sea, may develop in a similar fashion.  along the Mediterranean coast of Israel, over half of trawl catches are Lessepsians. Worse, full substitution has not occurred  total fishery productivity has also been decreased by the invaders.

Food web phase shift
The marbled spinefoot (Siganus rivulatus) and dusky spinefoot (Siganus luridus), both indigenous Red Sea rabbitfish, were first recorded off the coast of Mandate Palestine in 1924. In only a few decades, these schooling, herbivorous fish were able to settle in a range of habitats forming abundant populations, to the extent that George and Athanassiou, in a paper published in 1967, reported: "The millions of young abound over rocky outcropping grazing on the relatively abundant early summer algal cover". By 2004, a study on these species found that they comprise 80% of the abundance of herbivorous fish in the shallow coastal sites of Lebanon. They have been able to create marked phase shifts within the food web on multiple levels. Prior to the arrival of these Lessepsian migrants, the herbivores filled a small ecological role within the Eastern Mediterranean system. Therefore, with such a high influx of herbivorous species in a small period of time, this phenomenon has normalised the food web, increasing the rate at which algae are consumed and serving as a major prey item for large predators. Not only are these Red Sea migrants having a huge impact on this ecosystem, they also are affecting fisheries, as well, by outcompeting native fish of high commercial value, such as the seabream Boops boops. A nonindigenous species of mussel – Brachidontes pharaonis – from the Indo-Pacific has also proliferated. This mussel, which has a thicker shell than that of the native mussel, has created a change in predation patterns, as well, since they are more difficult to consume.

Anti-Lessepsian migration

Only a comparatively few species have colonised the Red Sea from the Mediterranean, and these are referred to as anti-Lessepsian migrants. As the predominant flow of the canal is from south to north, this acts against the southward movement of Mediterranean species, and as stated above, the Red Sea has higher salinity, fewer nutrients, and a much more diverse biota than the Eastern Mediterranean.

The sea slug Biuve fulvipunctata was originally described from waters around Japan and is widespread in the eastern Indian Ocean and western Pacific. It was first identified in the Mediterranean in 1961, and was seen in the Red Sea in 2005, most likely as a result of anti-Lessepsian migration. Among the fish species that have been confirmed as anti-Lessepsian migrants are peacock blenny (Salaria pavo), Solea aegyptiaca, Mediterranean moray (Muraena helena), the rock goby (Gobius paganellus), the meagre (Argyrosomus regius), the comber (Serranus cabrilla), European seabass (Dicentrarchus labrax), and spotted seabass (Dicentrarchus punctatus).

Factors facilitating Lessepsian migrant colonisation and expansion

Aswan Dam
Impact of Lessepsian migrants on system may be heavier due to a major anthropogenic factor: the construction of the Aswan Dam. Before construction, the Nile River was able to deeply influence the marine environment of the Eastern Mediterranean, discharging a high tonnage of nutrient-rich water. This resulted in a high abundance of phytoplankton in the delta which had a beneficial influence on the productivity in the surrounding sea, and attracted large schools of sardines, resulting in a highly lucrative commercial fishery. After the dam's completion in 1964, this dumping of nutrients into the Mediterranean diminished, and with it this productivity, leading to a sharp decrease in fish populations, namely sardines, which ultimately led to the collapse of the sardine fishery. As a result, the Egyptian purse-seine fishing industry today takes only 10% of the pre-dam catch, although this may also be due to the influence of dispersion of the Red Sea invasives. The freshwater discharge of the Nile could have been a natural barrier for some of the migrants in their movement into the Eastern Mediterranean.

Climate change
With climate change and the warming of seawater temperature, the thermophilic Lessepsian migrants may find it easier to reproduce, grow, and survive and give them a distinct advantage over native temperate Mediterranean taxa. Both processes, global warming and the influx of Lessepsian migrants, may impact the already teetering fisheries there by displacing commercially important native species, causing a phase shift in coastal ecosystems and changing seascape patterns. Furthermore, deepening of the warm surface layer is causing massive mortalities of organisms that do not tolerate high temperatures. Through various studies, species have been shown to be now restricted to deeper levels and thrive for shorter periods than in the past. Climate change is also another stressor on this system, the decline of natural barriers that were once in place to prevent many Red Sea natives from migrating to the Mediterranean. Due to global warming, the Eastern Mediterranean is experiencing an increase in temperature and salinity, which is decreasing the hydrological barrier between the two seas, favoring the migrants from the tropic Indo-Pacific which have a warm-water affinity and causing mortality in the temperate Eastern Mediterranean natives. The Bitter Lakes created a natural salinity barrier within the Suez Canal due to their high deposits of salt, preventing many species from migrating. However, due to the freshening of these lakes, this natural barrier is weakening, allowing a higher migration of invasive species.

Other examples

North America
The sea lamprey reached Lake Ontario from the Atlantic Ocean through shipping canals and was recorded for the first time in Lake Ontario in the 1830s, but Niagara Falls was a barrier to their further spread. The deepening of the Welland Canal in 1919 allowed the sea lamprey to bypass the barrier created by the falls, and by 1938, sea lampreys had been recorded in all of the Great Lakes.

The alewife (Alosa pseudoharengus), a species of shad from the Western Atlantic, also invaded the Great Lakes by using the Welland Canal to bypass Niagara Falls. They colonised the Great Lakes and became abundant mostly in Lake Huron and Lake Michigan, reaching their peak abundance by the 1950s and 1980s.

Europe
The white-eye bream (Ballerus sapa) has invaded the Vistula River basin by migrating along the Dnieper–Bug Canal in Belarus, which connects the Vistula drainage basin with that of the Dnieper River.

Panama
A small number of species have used the Panama Canal to move from the Atlantic Ocean to the Pacific Ocean, and vice versa. Six species of Atlantic fish were recorded on the Pacific side of the canal, and three species of Pacific fish were found on the Atlantic side of the canal. The Atlantic fish included Lupinoblennius dispar, Hypleurochilus aequipinnis, Barbulifer ceuthoecus, Oostethus lineatus, Lophogobius cyprinoides and Omobranchus punctatus, while the Pacific species moving to the Atlantic included Gnathanodon speciosus. The Gatun Lake's freshwater environment forms a barrier to the interchange of marine species.

Shipping containers
Shipping containers that fall off cargo ships can provide a new habitat for invasive species, in the same manner as an artificial reef. The ocean floor along shipping lanes is often devoid of hard surfaces needed by some species, and it is theorised  that lost containers could act as stepping stones that invasive species could use to travel to new harbours.

See also
 List of Lessepsian migrants

References

External links 
 

Biological invasions
Fish migrations
Fisheries science
Human impact on the environment
Introduced species
Marine biology
Suez Canal
Environment of the Mediterranean
Invasive species in the Mediterranean Sea